Corazón esmeralda, is a Venezuelan telenovela written by Vivel Nouel and adapted by Zaret Romero for Venevisión.

Irene Esser and Luis Gerónimo Abreu star as the protagonists while Mimi Lazo, Jorge Reyes, Juliet Lima and Maria Antonieta Duque star as the main antagonists. With the participation of Dora Mazzone, Jean Carlo Simancas and Cristóbal Lander.

As of March 10, 2014, Venevisión started broadcasting Corazón Esmeralda at 9:00 pm. The last episode was broadcast on September 30, 2014. Official production of Corazón Esmeralda began on 11 June 2013 in Aragua.

Plot
Corazón esmeralda tells the story of Beatriz Elena Beltrán, a young and beautiful ecologist who starts a campaign against wealthy businessman César Augusto Salvatierra whose industries are responsible for causing pollution in the town of Valle Bonito. César Augusto is a workaholic with three failed marriages and four children who are concerned with getting his fortune after his death. Therefore, he decides to seek out his long lost daughter with Marina Lozano, the only woman he ever loved. But what he doesn't know is that Beatriz is the long lost daughter he is looking for. He asks his godson and lawyer Juan Andrés Montalvo to search for his missing daughter so that she can receive part of his fortune.

After his death, his family becomes frustrated from a clause in his will that they can only receive their inheritance once they find the fifth heiress. His first ex-wife Federica hires Marcelo, a scoundrel and womanizing lawyer, to help her conspire get their hands on the Salvatierra fortune.

As Juan Andrés continues his search for his god-fathers long lost daughter, he falls in love with Beatriz, not knowing that she is the fifth heiress he is looking for. But their love will be tested by the jealousy, secrets and greed that surrounds them as the Salvatierra family and those close to them conspire to obtain the inheritance for themselves.

Cast
Confirmed as of April 26, 2013

Main cast 
Irene Esser as Beatriz Elena Beltrán
Luis Gerónimo Abreu as Juan Andrés Montalvo Cordero
Mimí Lazo as Federica del Rosario Pérez. Main villain
Jorge Reyes as Marcelo Egaña. Main villain
Dora Mazzone as Hortensia Estela Palacios Uribe
María Antonieta Duque as Blanca Aurora López
Juliet Lima as Vanessa Villamizar. Villain
Cristóbal Lander as Luis David León
Jean Carlo Simancas as César Augusto Salvatierra
Mariángel Ruiz as Marina Lozano

Also as main cast 
Flávia Gleske as Fernanda Salvatierra Pérez
Paula Woyzechowsky as Elia Magdalena Salvatierra Palacios
Sheryl Rubio as Rocío del Alba Salvatierra López 
Daniel Martínez-Campos as Napoleón Antonio Salvatierra López
Myriam Abreu as Lorena Martínez
José Ramón Barreto as Miguel Blanco
Sindy Lazo as Melinda Guaramato

Supporting cast 
Flor Elena González as Isabel Cordero de Montalvo
Beatriz Vásquez as Luisa Amelia Blanco
Alejandro Mata as Silvestre Montalvo
Julio Pereira as Ramón José Blanco
Adolfo Cubas as Rodrigo Beltrán
Ludwig Pineda as Domingo Renjifo
Josué Villae as Bruno Álvarez
Rhandy Piñango as Jaime Batista
Carmen Alicia Lara as Liliana Blanco
Reina Hinojosa as Ricarda

References

External links
Official website 

2014 telenovelas
Venevisión telenovelas
Venezuelan telenovelas
2014 Venezuelan television series debuts
2014 Venezuelan television series endings
Spanish-language telenovelas
Television shows set in Venezuela